Malcolm Henry Lowrie (10 March 1898 – 19 February 1919) was an Australian rules footballer who played with South Melbourne in the Victorian Football League (VFL).

Notes

External links 

1898 births
1919 deaths
Australian rules footballers from Victoria (Australia)
Sydney Swans players
Deaths from Spanish flu